Salt and Pepper is an album by Sonny Stitt and Paul Gonsalves released in 1964 on Impulse!. It was Stitt's second and last effort for the label, after Now!, recorded and released the same year.

Track listing
"Salt and Pepper" (Sonny Stitt, Paul Gonsalves) - 7:52
"S'posin' " (Paul Denniker, Andy Razaf) - 6:21
"Theme from Lord of the Flies" (Raymond Leppard) - 2:28
"Perdido" (Juan Tizol, Ervin Drake, Hans Lengsfelder) - 12:40
"Stardust" (Hoagy Carmichael, Mitchell Parish) - 6:09

Personnel
Paul Gonsalves - tenor saxophone
Sonny Stitt - tenor saxophone, alto saxophone, track 5
Hank Jones - piano
Milt Hinton - bass
Osie Johnson - drums

References 

1964 albums
Paul Gonsalves albums
Impulse! Records albums
Albums produced by Bob Thiele
Sonny Stitt albums